The year 1902 in archaeology involved some significant events.

Excavations
 Leopoldo Batres initiates first major excavations at Monte Albán.
 E. A. Wallis Budge begins project at Meroë.
 Ludwig Borchardt leads Deutsche Orient-Gesellschaft excavations at the Ancient Egyptian necropolis of Abusir.
 Georgios Sotiriadis excavates the tomb of the Macedonian warriors at the Battle of Chaeronea (338 BC).

Finds
 May 17 – Antikythera mechanism found by Valerios Stais
 Lansing Man found near Lansing, Kansas on the western bank of the Missouri River
 Etruscan chariot at Monteleone di Spoleto
 Tuxtla Statuette
 Böyük Dəhnə ancient artifacts
 Saimaluu Tash petroglyphs
 Tomb KV45 (Userhet) in the Valley of the Kings in Egypt, discovered by Howard Carter working for Theodore M. Davis.
 Neolithic settlement of Magoula Balomenou near Chaeronea, discovered by Georgios Sotiriadis.

Miscellaneous
 Images of bison on the ceiling of the Cave of Altamira, Spain (discovered in 1879), accepted as authentic of c. 12000 BC.
 Restoration of Lion of Chaeronea begins.

Births
 February 19 – Humfry Payne, English Classical archaeologist (d. 1936).
 May 10 – Ian Richmond, British archaeologist of Ancient Rome (d. 1965).
 August 25 – Clarence Hungerford Webb, American archaeologist (d. 1991).
 Arvid Andrén, Swedish classical art historian (d. 1999).

Deaths
 March 2 – Kate Bradbury Griffith, English Egyptologist (b. 1854)
 October 7 – Henry Syer Cuming, antiquarian, collector and secretary of the British Archaeological Association (b. 1817)

See also
 List of years in archaeology
 1901 in archaeology
 1903 in archaeology

References

Archaeology
Archaeology
Archaeology by year